ASG may refer to:

Businesses and organizations 
Abu Sayyaf Group, a militant Islamist group based in the Philippines
 Albright Stonebridge Group (est. 2009), a global business strategy firm based in Washington, D.C., United States
Avia Solutions Group global aerospace business group founded in Lithuania
All Saints Greek Orthodox Grammar School, in New South Wales, Australia
ASG Technologies, formerly known as Allen Systems Group, headquartered in Naples, Florida
AS Gien, a French association football club
Astronomical Society of Glasgow
Australasian Seabird Group, a special interest group of Birds Australia
Labour and Social Justice – The Electoral Alternative (Arbeit & soziale Gerechtigkeit), a left-wing German political party founded in 2005
Gomera Socialist Group, (Agrupación Socialista Gomera) a left-wing Spanish political party operating on the island of La Gomera in the Canary Islands

Science and technology 
Abstract semantic graph, in computer science, a form of abstract syntax
Australian Standard Garratt, a World War II-era Australian steam-engine locomotive model

Other uses 
ASG (band), from Wilmington, North Carolina
Alsager railway station, Cheshire, England (national rail code)
Ashburton Aerodrome, New Zealand (IATA airport code)
Austrian Standard German, the variety of Standard German written and spoken in Austria